Juan Perinetti (1891 – 31 July 1957) was an Argentine footballer. He played in seven matches for the Argentina national football team in 1915 and 1916. He was also part of Argentina's squad for the 1919 South American Championship.

References

External links
 
 

1891 births
1957 deaths
Argentine footballers
Argentina international footballers
Place of birth missing
Association football forwards
Racing Club de Avellaneda footballers
Talleres de Remedios de Escalada footballers